Porky's Bear Facts is a 1941 Warner Bros. Looney Tunes cartoon animated short directed by Friz Freleng. The short was released on March 29, 1941, and stars Porky Pig. The voices were performed by Mel Blanc.

This short is an adaptation of the Aesop fable "The Ant and the Grasshopper."

Plot

The attitudes of the two central characters in this cartoon short - Porky Pig and an unnamed bear - form the main plot of this Aesop fable adaptation, with Porky taking the role of the tireless, hard-working ant and the bear the role of the grasshopper, the lazy indigent who would rather do nothing.

The short opens on Porky plowing his land, whistling and singing a happy, carefree song, "As Ye Sow So Shall Ye Reap," to the tune of "The Girl With The Pigtails In Her Hair". The animals similarly work hard, with several spot gags providing these examples.

The scene then pans over to the neighbor's farm, where a lazy bear is strumming on his ukulele, the song "Working Can Wait" extolling the virtues of not having to work and just relax. Several animals on the farm—hens playing games, a cow reading "Ferdinand the Bull" and a mouse reading "Of Mice and Men"—have taken up the lazy farmer's habits; the dog is lying asleep at his side.

The months pass, and in January a fierce blizzard strikes the area. The scene shifts to the bear's shack, and he quickly realizes he has no food. After rummaging through the house to find so much as a morsel, he finds nothing in his cupboards. After describing a delicious feast, the bear's dog finds empty cans, prompting both the bear and his canine companion to hurriedly search the cans for food. They find one bean in a can, but just as they are saying grace, the mouse steals the bean. The bear cries and bemoans his fate as the dog remarks, "I wouldn't be surprised if he tries to eat me!" Just as he says that, the bear has silverware in hand and goes after the dog.

The bear stalks his pet dog outside, the dog begging off ... until both walk past Porky's window and see that he and his dog have sat down to dinner. The bear and his pet knock on the door and ask to join Porky for dinner, but the pig slams the door on them, saying, "You've buttered your bed, now sleep in it!" Just as he heads back to the table, he sees the "love thy neighbor" sign at the door, and he feels obligated to invite his lazy neighbors in. The bear quickly feasts at the table.

At the end, the bear remarks that he has learned his lesson and vows not to be hungry again next winter. Then, he spots spring about to arrive ... the bear sprints back to his porch, singing "Working Can Wait."

References

External links
 

1941 films
1941 animated films
Looney Tunes shorts
Animated films about bears
Short films directed by Friz Freleng
1940s American animated films
Films based on Aesop's Fables
Porky Pig films
Films scored by Carl Stalling
American black-and-white films
Films with screenplays by Michael Maltese